The Canadian Screen Award for Best Hair is an annual award, presented by the Academy of Canadian Cinema and Television, as part of the Canadian Screen Awards program, to honour achievements in hairstyling in Canadian film.

The award was introduced for the first time at the 7th Canadian Screen Awards. Prior to its creation, hairstylists were eligible for nomination in the category for Best Makeup.

2010s

2020s

See also
Prix Iris for Best Hair

References

Film awards for makeup and hairstyling
Hair